The Manitou is a 1978 American supernatural body horror film produced and directed by William Girdler. It stars Tony Curtis, Michael Ansara and Susan Strasberg. It is based on the 1976 novel of the same name by Graham Masterton, which was inspired by the concept of manitou in Native American theology, believed to be a spiritual and fundamental life force by members of the Algonquian peoples.

Girdler died in a helicopter accident prior to the film's release.

Plot
A woman named Karen Tandy (Susan Strasberg), who is suffering from a growing tumor on her neck, enters a hospital in San Francisco. After  a series of X-rays, the doctors led by Dr. Jack Hughes (Jon Cedar) begin to think it is a growing fetus although they don't believe it outright and keeps Karen in the dark about its true nature. She is advised by the doctors to undergo a surgery to remove the tumour and she agrees, although anxious inside. She seeks the comfort of an old friend and ex-employer named Harry Erskine (Tony Curtis). Erskine, a sham himself runs his tarot card business by fooling gullible people like Mrs. Herz (Lurene Tuttle) who frequents him for seeking fortunate news. Promising them good fortune, Harry cheats them out of their money while enjoying his carefree life.

Karen and Harry catch up on old times and they enjoy each other's company briefly when Karen declares her condition. Harry reassures her that everything will be fine once the surgery is over. As Karen spends the night at Harry's apartment in her sleep unconsciously she utters a phrase "pana witchy salatoo" which Harry hears unknowingly and it discomforts him slightly.

The next day as he's about to drop her at the surgery, he mentions to her the last night's sleep talking to which she feigns complete ignorance having never heard it before.
As the surgery commences the lead doctor prepares to remove the tumor growth by using a scalpel but his hands shake and against his will he starts to slice his own left hand disrupting the surgery. Meanwhile, Mrs. Herz attends another session with Harry when in the middle of it she suffers a seizure uttering the phrase same as that of Karen. As Harry tries to call for an ambulance she leaves his room, levitates a few distance and falls down the staircase to her death. Dr Hughes and his companions informs the condition to Harry who becomes further worried. Convinced that some kind of black magic is involved, he seeks out an old acquaintance named Amelia Caruso (Stella Stevens). She used to be in the psychic business acting as a medium and agrees to help him after much debate with her partner MacArthur (Hugh Corcoran). Harry, Amelia, MacArthur and Amelia's aunt Mrs. Karmann (Ann Sothern) visits Karen's home where they hold a seance to draw out the spirit that's causing all the trouble. A violent storm and lightning hinders their efforts and Mrs. Karmann declares that she could only see the statue of an Indian medicine man. Harry visits aging Dr. Snow (Burgess Meredith), an anthropologist by profession along with Amelia and MacArthur. They share about the recent developments to which Dr. Snow is initially dismissive and recounts the scarce tales of 400 years old Indian medicine men who used to live before they went extinct. Upon hearing the strange phrase he deduces it partially to be as 'my death foretells my return'. Unable to help them directly he advises them that they should seek the council of the vestigial Indian medicine men now surviving in the remote parts.

Harry visits John Singing Rock, (Michael Ansara) a medicine man who tells him about the manitou, the spirits of natural elements surrounding them. He refuses Harry's plea but later changes his mind and in order to render his service requests 100,000$. Harry and John reaches the hospital and they draw a circle of sand around Karen's bed in order to limit the spirit possessing her. After conversing with the spirit through Karen he reveals himself to be an old Native American shaman, Misquamacus; when he says that he is reincarnating himself through the young woman to exact his revenge on the white men who invaded North America and exterminated its native peoples. He further warns John that helping white men such as Harry and Karen is ill advised and against his wishes. John prepares to stop Misquamacus's growing power and calls upon the strength of other manitous to no avail. the spirit kills one of the male nurse looking after Karen at night and finally claws it way out from Karen's neck in the flesh as a dwarf sized man. It also reanimates the dead nurse to harm others but John manages to stop it further. In another encounter the spirit summons an ancient Indian demon by the name of the Lizard of the Tree while managing to erase the sand circle to harm Dr. Hughes on his right hand by transfixing his gaze momentarily. As Harry takes Hughes to the lower levels to treat his wounds he returns to find the entire floor covered in ice, even the receptionist. Harry finds John sitting alone in the room who exclaims the spirit inflicted wounds on his face with surgical instruments. As they are about to leave they are faced with the spirit caught amidst a snowstorm caused by summoning of another demon called The Star Beast, also known as The Spirit of the North Wind. In the altercation the receptionist is decapitated as Harry throws a typewriter towards the spirit which temporarily weakens it allowing them to escape. John reveals that he won't be able to stop the spirit when Harry comes up with the idea of using the manitous of electrical equipment surrounding them. John reluctantly agrees and proposes he will act as a medium for the machine manitous to manifest themselves. As they are discussing the entire room shakes up with a violent earthquake which John reveals as the coming of The Great Old One, a powerful satanic demon, through a portal opened by the spirit.

Harry instructs Dr. Hughes to switch on all the machines in the hospital while he and John travels towards the spirit. They find Karen in her bed inside a room filled with space illusion. John tries to channel the machine manitous but is unsuccessful accepting defeat but Harry refuses to give in. He tries to distract the spirit while calling on Karen. Karen gains consciousness and channels the machine manitous to finally defeat the spirit and the Great Old One behind the portal. As the ordeal is over Harry and Karen reunites and Harry accompanies John to a cab for the airport thanking him for his help. John thanks him back and warns that they might meet the spirit once again for its body maybe destroyed but not its ethereal form.

Cast 
 Tony Curtis as Harry Erskine
 Michael Ansara as John Singing Rock
 Susan Strasberg as Karen Tandy
 Stella Stevens as Amelia Caruso
 Jon Cedar as Dr. Jack Hughes
 Ann Sothern as Mrs. Karmann
 Burgess Meredith as Dr. Snow
 Paul Mantee as Dr. McEvoy
 Jeanette Nolan as Mrs. Winconis
 Lurene Tuttle as Mrs. Herz
 Hugh Corcoran as MacArthur

Release
The film was released theatrically by AVCO Embassy Pictures on April 28, 1978, in New York, and May 17, 1978, in Los Angeles. The film was released on DVD by Momentum Pictures on October 24, 2005. It was re-released on Blu-ray by Anchor Bay Entertainment on March 6, 2007.

According to the Anchor Bay Blu-ray release, the original negative is lost, and the film had to be restored from alternate elements.

Reception
On review aggregator website Rotten Tomatoes, The Manitou has a 40% approval rating based on 10 reviews, with an average rating of 5.1/10. The staff of Variety wrote, "This bout between good and Satan includes some scares, camp and better than average credits". Time Outs Derek Adams praised the film's special effects and called the film "a successful excursion, spoiled only by the director's habit of plopping in postcard views of the Golden Gate Bridge instead of exteriors". Donald Guarisco of AllMovie criticized the film's script and direction but complimented the acting, special effects and ending. Author John Kenneth Muir wrote the film has "an infectious feeling of fun" despite being "patently absurd".

Masterton, who wrote the source novel, said he "liked it a lot".

References

External links
 
 
 
 

1978 films
1978 horror films
American independent films
American supernatural horror films
Redsploitation
Embassy Pictures films
Films set in San Francisco
Films about Native Americans
Films directed by William Girdler
Films based on horror novels
Films based on British novels
Films scored by Lalo Schifrin
Shamanism in popular culture
Films based on Native American mythology
Films about reincarnation
1970s English-language films
1970s American films